Jagdgeschwader 71 may refer to:
Taktisches Luftwaffengeschwader 71 "Richthofen" of the German Air Force or
Jagdgeschwader 71 (World War II) of Nazi Germany's Luftwaffe